Nattuchalai is a village in the Pattukkottai taluk of Thanjavur district, Tamil Nadu, India. Jeyaratha Arunagiri is a councilor. Jayanthi is a president. Nattuchalai is also called as NTC by the surrounding people.

Demographics 

In the 2001 census, Nattuchalai had a total population of 3454 with 1712 males and 1742 females. The sex ratio was 1.018. The literacy rate was 73.77.

It is located along the way from Pattukkottai to Madukkur, and all government facilities except thodakka velanmai kootturavu vanki are available in the village. Nattuchalai official Website has been launched. All official news is displayed on this website, www.nattuchalai.com

A combination of people from various castes live in Nattuchalai, and most villagers are either engineers or farmers. Its main industry is agriculture. The youth of the village enjoy cricket, volleyball and football. Nattuchalai's main festivals are the Sri Ayyanar festival, Mariamman Thiruvizha, Idumban, and the Nallayiamman temple festival.

One of the villages most famous residents is actor Vijayakumar, who has acted in many popular Tamil movies, and has many awards and accolades.

References

External links
nattuchalai.com
நாட்டுச்சாலை நண்பர்கள் (Nattuccalai Friends) (Facebook Account)
Blogger Link

Villages in Thanjavur district